Carl King is a fictional character in Emmerdale.

Carl King may also refer to:

 American musician whose real name is Carl King, Sir Millard Mulch
Carl King (singer)

See also
King Carl (disambiguation)